State Route 70 (SR 70) is an  state highway entirely within southern Shelby County in the north-central part of the U.S. state of Alabama. The western terminus of the highway is at an intersection with U.S. Route 31 (US 31), just north of Calera. The eastern terminus of the highway is at an intersection with SR 25 in Columbiana. West of the western terminus, the roadway continues as Shelby County Road 22.

Route description

History

Until the mid-1990s, SR 70 between Columbiana and Calera traveled through a mostly rural area of the county. Since then, numerous new housing developments have been constructed along this highway, to house part of the growing population of Shelby County. Besides Columbiana and Calera, SR 70 does not travels through any other incorporated towns or villages.

Major intersections

See also

References

070
Transportation in Shelby County, Alabama